Charles Henry Bell (November 18, 1823 – November 11, 1893) was an American lawyer and Republican politician from Exeter, New Hampshire.  Bell served New Hampshire in both the New Hampshire House of Representatives and the New Hampshire Senate, as a U.S. Senator, and as the 38th governor of New Hampshire.

Early life
Bell was born on November 18, 1823 in Chester, New Hampshire.

Family
Charles was one of the ten children of Governor John Bell. He was also the nephew of Samuel Bell, first cousin of James Bell and the first cousin, once removed of Samuel Newell Bell.

Service in the New Hampshire General Court
Bell's career in the New Hampshire General Court was notable in that he held two unique offices.  In 1860 Bell was the Speaker of the New Hampshire House of Representatives. and President of the New Hampshire Senate in 1864.

Writings
Bell was the author of an influential early history of Exeter, New Hampshire, as well as a number of other books. His first wife was Sarah Almira Gilman, daughter of Nicholas Gilman; his second wife Helen A. (Williams) daughter of Reuel Williams of Portland, ME, and widow of John Taylor Gilman of Exeter. Both wives were descendants of Edward Gilman Sr., an early Exeter settler who had previously lived in Hingham, Massachusetts, and Ipswich, Massachusetts.

Honors
Bell was elected a member of the American Antiquarian Society in 1868.

Death and burial
Bell died in 1893 in Exeter, New Hampshire, and is buried at the Exeter Cemetery in that town.

Footnotes

External links
Bell's Congressional biography
Bell at New Hampshire's Division of Historic Resources

Exeter in 1776, Charles Henry Bell, News-Letter Press, Exeter, N.H. 1876
Phillips Exeter Academy in New Hampshire, Charles Henry Bell, William B. Morrill, Exeter, N.H., 1883
A Memorial of Charles Henry Bell, Exeter, N.H., Jeremiah Smith, Mellen Chamberlain, Privately Printed, 1894

1823 births
1893 deaths
People from Chester, New Hampshire
American people of Scotch-Irish descent
Republican Party United States senators from New Hampshire
Republican Party governors of New Hampshire
Republican Party members of the New Hampshire House of Representatives
Presidents of the New Hampshire Senate
Republican Party New Hampshire state senators
People from Exeter, New Hampshire
19th-century American politicians
Members of the American Antiquarian Society
Phillips Exeter Academy alumni
Dartmouth College alumni